Ritchie was the second of three posthumously released "original" albums by Ritchie Valens. It includes his remaining unissued masters from Gold Star Studios plus demos he recorded at manager Robert Keane's home studio. Also featured is Valens' last charted single, "Little Girl", which reached #92 on the Billboard charts in July 1959.

Track listings
All songs written by Ritchie Valens, except where indicated.

Side 1
"Stay Beside Me" (Bill Olofson, Maurice Ellenhorn)
"Cry, Cry, Cry" (Valens, Robert Kuhn)
"Big Baby Blues"
"The Paddi-Wack Song"
"My Darling Is Gone"
"Hurry Up" (Shari Sheeley)
Side 2
"Little Girl" (Valens, Kuhn)
"Now You're Gone"
"Fast Freight"
"Ritchie's Blues" (Valens, Kuhn)
"Rockin' All Night"

External links

Del-Fi Records albums
Ritchie Valens albums
1959 albums
Albums recorded at Gold Star Studios